Varmazyar in Iran may refer to:
 Varmazyar, Kermanshah
 Varmazyar, Showt, West Azerbaijan Province
 Varmazyar, Urmia, West Azerbaijan Province
 Varmazyar-e Olya, Zanjan Province
 Varmazyar-e Sofla, Zanjan Province